The World RX of Catalunya is a Rallycross event held in Spain for the FIA World Rallycross Championship. The event made its debut in the 2015 season, at the Circuit de Barcelona-Catalunya in the town of Montmeló, Catalonia.

In 2015 and 2016, the event was called "World RX of Spain", changing its name in 2017 and 2018 to "World RX of Barcelona". From 2019 onwards, it's called "World RX of Catalunya".

Due to COVID-19 pandemic which affected the 2020 FIA World Rallycross Championship season calendar, the circuit hosted a double-header season finale. The first race was named as World RX of Pirineus-Barcelona 2030 as mark of support for Pyrenees-Barcelona bid for the 2030 Winter Olympics. The second race was held under World RX of Catalunya name.

Past winners

References

External links

Rallycross
Barcelona